Lu Gwei-djen (July 22, 1904 – November 28, 1991) was a Chinese biochemist and historian. She was an expert on the history of science and technology in China and a researcher of nutriology.  She was an important researcher and co-author of the project Science and Civilisation in China led by Joseph Needham.

Career

Lu began her distinguished career teaching biochemistry at the Women's Medical College in Shanghai between 1928–30, then moved to teach at the Medical School at St. John's University, Shanghai between 1930-33. She then took up a post as Research Assistant at the Henry Lester Institute for Medical Research, Shanghai from 1933-37.

In 1938, she came to the UK for a year's postgraduate study at the University of Cambridge under Dorothy M. Needham, as a research student at Newnham College.

In 1939, during World War II, she took up a post as Research Fellow at the Institute of Experimental Biochemistry, University of California, Berkeley, and at the Harriman Research Lab, San Francisco, from 1939-41. She moved to the Hillman Hospital, Birmingham, Alabama from 1941–42, and then to the International Cancer Research Foundation, Philadelphia, from 1942-45.

In 1945, she joined the Needhams in Chongqing as a consultant for nutrition at the Co-operation office and in 1948, moved to Paris to work at UNESCO at the secretariat for natural sciences.

From 1947 onwards, she was a Research Fellow of the Wellcome Medical Foundation, working with Dr Joseph Needham in Cambridge on the 'Science & Civilisation in China' project.

She was a Foundation Fellow of Lucy Cavendish College, Cambridge.

Works
Among the work on which she is credited as co-author are:

Legacy
The Lu Gwei-Djen Prize for the History of Science awarded by Gonville and Caius College, Cambridge is named in her honour as is the Lu Gwei Djen Research Fellowship awarded by Lucy Cavendish College, Cambridge - a position previously held by biophysicist Dr Eileen Nugent.

Personal life
The daughter of a pharmacist, she was well known as Needham's long-time collaborator, co-author, Chinese language teacher and his second wife.

References

Additional sources 

  Also published as Gun, Book and Compass.
 

1904 births
1991 deaths
Joseph Needham
Alumni of Newnham College, Cambridge
Chinese biochemists
Chinese emigrants to the United Kingdom
Fellows of Lucy Cavendish College, Cambridge
Chinese sinologists
Writers from Nanjing
Chinese science writers
Chemists from Jiangsu
Historians from Jiangsu
20th-century Chinese historians
Scientists from Nanjing
Biologists from Jiangsu